"Shriners Convention" is a song written and recorded by American musician Ray Stevens. It is based on Stevens' experiences at an Atlanta hotel where an actual Shriners convention was being held.

Shriners have taken the song as good-natured humor, and have even welcomed Stevens' participation in fundraising activities, as his fame attracts more attendees to charity events. It has been suggested that Stevens' presence indicates that Shriners have a sense of humor about themselves, making the group seem more accessible.

Content
The premise of the song is the "43rd Annual Convention of the Grand Mystic Royal Order of the Nobles of the Ali Baba Temple of the Shrine."  Each verse describes a different aspect of the convention: first a parade, then a formal banquet, and finally a ceremonial "secret meeting", which is actually a poker game.

"Meanwhile, back at the motel..." 

The song's humor includes a series of phone calls between two Shriners from the Hahira delegation: "Illustrious Potentate" Bubba, and "Noble Lumpkin" Coy, the latter of whom fails to show up at any convention gatherings, choosing instead to carouse at the motel with his Harley, dishonoring the whole delegation.  Bubba eventually kicks Coy out of the Shrine, but Coy undauntedly considers joining the Hells Angels, cranks his motorcycle and hangs up.

While only Bubba's side of the conversation is heard, Coy's comments are made known through Bubba's replies. This comedy format is similar to routines by Shelley Berman and Bob Newhart.

Remake
In 1983 Stevens re-recorded the song, adding a reference to the Knights of Columbus in the dialogue.

Music video
A video for "Shriners Convention" appears in Stevens's 1995 direct-to-video film, Get Serious!  The song also ties into the film's plot, wherein a genuine Illustrious Potentate and country sheriff named Bubba, along with his deputy Coy (who in truth somewhat enjoys being mistaken for the Coy of the song) and certain family members and friends, believe that Stevens is deliberately misrepresenting them in his songs. All of this alludes to another Stevens song, "Dudley Do-Right of the Highway Patrol”.

Chart performance

References

External links
Editorial of a Canadian Freemason Lodge commenting on negative stereotypes in "Shriners Convention."

1980 singles
Comedy songs
Ray Stevens songs
Songs written by Ray Stevens
1980 songs
RCA Records singles